Lyssa: Rural Gods and Astonishing Punishments is the seventh album by the Greek metal band Nightfall.

Track listing

Personnel 
 Efthimis Karadimas - vocals, bass guitar
 George Bokos  - guitars
 Bob Katsionis - keyboards
 George Kollias - drums
 Production
 Efthimis Karadimas - producer
 Ahti Kortelainen - mixing
 Andrianos Papamarkou - engineering (vocals)
 Lambros Slyris - engineering (drums)
 George Bokos - engineering (guitars, bass guitar, keyboards), editing
 Seth - artwork
 Marilisa Anastassopoulou - photography

Nightfall (band) albums
2004 albums